Injun may refer to:

Injun, an obsolete alteration of "Indian" when referring to Native Americans; now generally considered pejorative (see Native American name controversy)
Injun, a series of Van Allen Belt satellites
Injun Creek, a stream in Tennessee, U.S.
Injun Joe, main antagonist of Mark Twain's The Adventures of Tom Sawyer

See also
Cajun